Guðrún Arnardóttir (born 24 September 1971) is a retired Icelandic athlete who specialized in the 400 metres hurdles. Her biggest success was reaching the final at the 2000 Olympic Games in Sydney where she finished seventh. On December 29th she was inducted in to the Icelandic hall of fame.

Competition record

Personal bests
Outdoor
200 metres – 23.81 (Odense 1997) NR
400 metres – 52.83 (London 1997) NR
100 metres hurdles – 13.18 (+1.2 m/s) (Lexington 1996) NR
400 metres hurdles – 54.37 (London 2000) NR

Indoor
400 metres – 53.11 (Baton Rouge 1995) NR
50 metres hurdles – 6.89 (Reykjavík 2000) NR
60 metres hurdles – 8.31 (Lexington 1996, Gent 2000) NR

External links
IAAF profile
 

1971 births
Living people
Gudrun Arnardottir
Gudrun Arnardottir
Athletes (track and field) at the 1996 Summer Olympics
Athletes (track and field) at the 2000 Summer Olympics
Place of birth missing (living people)
20th-century Icelandic women
21st-century Icelandic women